Chesterton Academy of The Holy Family is a Catholic high school located in Lisle, Illinois. The school is affiliated with the Roman Catholic Diocese of Joliet in Illinois.

A cardiologist named Sean Tierney co-founded the school in Downers Grove, Illinois, along with local business owner, Brenie Bowles. The school, which uses the curriculum of the Chesterton Academy in Minnesota, opened on August 24, 2015. The curriculum intentionally does not emphasize technology in the classroom, believing that students perform better with traditional learning materials.  The school has many athletic teams, which compete in the IHSA,  including girls' volleyball, boys' and girls' soccer and boys' and girls' basketball. In 2018–2019, their men's rugby team had their debut season.

References

External links
 Chesterton Academy of The Holy Family

Catholic secondary schools in Illinois
Roman Catholic Diocese of Joliet in Illinois
Lisle, Illinois
2015 establishments in Illinois
Schools in DuPage County, Illinois